Iryna Naumivna Borzova (born Barulya, born August 28, 1982 in Vinnytsia, Soviet Ukraine, USSR) is a Ukrainian business woman and politician. She was the People's Deputy of Ukraine of the IX convocation. She was a member of the Verkhovna Rada Committee on Youth and Sports, and Chairman of the Subcommittee on State Youth Policy.

Biography 
Together with her father Naum Barulei, Iryna Borzova owns Profil-N LLC, registered in the Crimean Sudak. The company operates restaurants. In 2014, after the occupation of Crimea by Russia, its business was re-registered in accordance with Russian law, and according to the tax service of the Russian Federation. In 2016, it earned a profit of about 600 thousand rubles. Iryna Borzova is also the owner of the "Delicious Hedgehog cafe" chain.

In the 2015 local elections, Iryna Borzova ran for the Vinnytsia City Council from Volodymyr Groysman's Vinnytsia European Strategy party. He is the chairman of the Vinnytsia city organization of the "Ukrainian House" political party.

In 2019, Borzova was elected People's Deputy of Ukraine in the single-mandate constituency № 14 (Zhmerynka, Barsky, Zhmerynsky, Litynsky, Tyvrivsky districts) from the "Servant of the People" party. During the nomination in her constituency, she presented gifts to children through the Irina Borzova Charitable Foundation, which journalists call a PR move. At the time of the election: natural person-entrepreneur, non-partisan. Lives in Vinnytsia.

She is a member of the "Servant of the People" party, chairman of the Vinnytsia regional organization.

Family

She is married to her husband, Serhiy Borzov. They have 2 daughters, Anna and Yelyzaveta, and a son, Matviy.

References 

21st-century Ukrainian women politicians
Ukrainian women in business
1982 births
Living people
Servant of the People (political party) politicians
Ninth convocation members of the Verkhovna Rada
Politicians from Vinnytsia
Women members of the Verkhovna Rada